is a passenger railway station located in the town of Mannō, Kagawa, Japan.  It is operated by the private transportation company Takamatsu-Kotohira Electric Railroad (Kotoden) and is designated station "K19".

Lines
Hazama Station is a statin on the Kotoden Kotohira Line and is located 29.1 km from the opposing terminus of the line at Takamatsu-Chikkō Station.

Layout
The station consists of two opposed side platforms connected by a level crossing. The station is unattended and there is no station building, but only a shelter on each platform.

Adjacent stations

History
Hazama Station opened on March 15, 1927 as a station of the Kotohira Electric Railway. On November 1, 1943 it became  a station on the Takamatsu Kotohira Electric Railway Kotohira Line due to a company merger.

Surrounding area
Hazama Pond
Kagawa Prefectural Route 282 Takamatsu Kotohira Line (former National Route 32)

Passenger statistics

See also
 List of railway stations in Japan

References

External links

  

Railway stations in Japan opened in 1927
Railway stations in Kagawa Prefecture
Mannō, Kagawa